Chewele is a settlement in Kenya's Coast Province. It is located on the shores of the Tana River.

References 

Populated places in Coast Province